Perley Cleveland Price (December 25, 1888 – February 7, 1961) was a Canadian politician. He served in the Legislative Assembly of New Brunswick from 1957 to 1960 as member of the Liberal party.

References

1888 births
1961 deaths
New Brunswick Liberal Association MLAs